Vyacheslav Nikolayevich Ivanov (born 30 July 1938) is a former rower, and one of the most accomplished rowers of his generation. He rowed for the Soviet Union, and he won the Olympic gold medals in the single sculls class at the 1956 Melbourne Games, the 1960 Rome Games and the 1964 Tokyo Games.

Ivanov was the first man to win the single sculls event three times in the Olympics. At the time, only Americans Jack Kelly Sr. and Paul Costello and Briton Jack Beresford had won three Olympic gold medals in the sport of rowing (since surpassed by Steve Redgrave and others). The only other person to match Ivanov's achievement and win three gold medals in the single scull is Finland's Pertti Karppinen.

Rowing career 
Ivanov started as a boxer, in 1950. Starting from 1952 he combined boxing with rowing, eventually chose the latter sport. By 1955, at the age of 17, he won the USSR junior championships and finished third in the senior championships, beating the Olympic single scull champion Yuriy Tyukalov in the process. In 1956, he won his first Soviet and European titles and an Olympic gold medal. At the Olympics he was in fourth place at the 1500 meter mark. With only 500 meters left, he began a devastating sprint, catching Teodor Kocerka, Jack Kelly Jr., and then Stuart Mackenzie who had led the entire race. At the award ceremony, excited, Ivanov dropped his gold medal into Lake Wendouree, where the race took place. His diving attempts to rescue the medal failed, and the IOC later provided him with a replacement.

After the Olympics Mackenzie consistently defeated Ivanov at the Henley Royal Regatta and at the European Rowing Championships in 1957 and 1958. Disappointed by his losses, Ivanov was considering to retire, but was brought back to shape by his coach Arkady Nikolayev. In 1959 Ivanov regained the European title. He also set a world best time of 6:58.8 for a 2000 m single scull race, becoming the first person to break the seven-minute barrier.

At the 1960 Olympics, Ivanov won again with a blistering sprint, defeating Achim Hill by more than 6 seconds. Mackenzie withdrew because of illness. In 1962, Ivanov won the first ever World Rowing Championship, defeating Mackenzie and Seymour Cromwell. At the 1963 European Rowing Championships, he came fourth. Ivanov faced Hill again at the 1964 Olympics. This time he trailed Hill by 7 seconds with 500 m to go, but finished 3.73 seconds ahead owing to his trademark sprint. Ivanov missed the 1965 European Rowing Championships due to illness. Ivanov was hoping to compete at the 1968 Olympics, but was left out of the Soviet team in favor of a younger rower (Viktor Melnikov). Melnikov failed to reach the Olympic final, while Ivanov retired next year.

In addition to the Olympics, Ivanov won 11 Soviet single scull titles (1956–1966) and 4 European titles. He was awarded the Order of the Red Banner of Labour (1960) and two Orders of the Badge of Honour (1957 and 1965).

Life after retirement
In 1960, at the peak of his rowing career, Ivanov graduated from a military school, and in 1969 received his master's degree from the Volgograd Institute of Physical Education. After retiring from competitions he served as a navy officer and retired in the rank of captain. He then resumed competing in rowing in the masters category.

Publications

References

External links

 
 

1938 births
Living people
Rowers from Moscow
Russian male rowers
Soviet male rowers
Honoured Masters of Sport of the USSR
Recipients of the Order of Honour (Russia)
Recipients of the Order of the Red Banner of Labour
European Rowing Championships medalists
Medalists at the 1956 Summer Olympics
Medalists at the 1960 Summer Olympics
Medalists at the 1964 Summer Olympics
Olympic gold medalists for the Soviet Union
Olympic medalists in rowing
Olympic rowers of the Soviet Union
Rowers at the 1956 Summer Olympics
Rowers at the 1960 Summer Olympics
Rowers at the 1964 Summer Olympics
World Rowing Championships medalists for the Soviet Union